Vikrama Chola, known as Kō Parakēsari Varman, was a 12th-century ruler (r. c. 1118–1135 CE) of the Chola Empire in southern India. He succeeded his father Kulothunga I (r. c. 1070–1120 CE) to the throne. Vikrama Chola was crowned as the heir-apparent by his father early in his life. He was appointed as viceroy of the Vengi province in 1089 C.E., succeeding his brother Rajaraja Chodaganga. Vikrama during his tenure successfully managed to check the ambitions of the Western Chalukya Vikramaditya VI on the Vengi kingdom.Vikrama Chola inherited the territories which included Tamil Nadu and some parts of Andhra Pradesh.

In 1118 C.E., the aging Kulothunga recalled Vikrama Chola from Vengi to the south to appoint him as his co-regent. He assumed many of the titles of his father including Rajakesari when he was a co-regent. He subsequently switched to Parakesari when he ascended the throne. This took place on 29 June 1118 C.E. Vikrama continued to rule joinltly with his father until the latter's death in 1122 C.E.  However the Western Chalukyas, utilising the opportunity of proper leadership in Vengi, invaded and captured the Eastern Chalukyan provinces.

Early life

Vikrama Chola was the fourth son of Kulothunga I. He was a younger brother of Vira Chola who was the third son of Kulothunga I. The Tamil inscriptions of Vikrama Chola confirm that he left the north for the south (of the Chola kingdom) before he was crowned king.

Accession

.Vikrama Chola was crowned as the heir-apparent by his father early in his life. He was appointed as viceroy of the Vengi province in 1089 C.E., succeeding his brother Rajaraja Chodaganga. Vikrama during his tenure successfully managed to check the ambitions of the Western Chalukya Vikramaditya VI on the Vengi kingdom.

In 1118 C.E., the aging Kulothunga recalled Vikrama Chola from Vengi to the south to appoint him as his co-regent. He assumed many of the titles of his father including Rajakesari when he was a co-regent. He subsequently switched to Parakesari when he ascended the throne. This took place on 29 June 1118 C.E. Vikrama continued to rule joinltly with his father until the latter's death in 1122 C.E.  However the Western Chalukyas, utilising the opportunity of proper leadership in Vengi, invaded and captured the Eastern Chalukyan provinces.

Military campaigns

Kalinga expedition

While he was still a crown prince, Vikrama led an expedition to the Kalinga country on behalf of his father (1110 C.E.). The Kalinga war is also referred to in the inscriptions and in the epic Vikkiramacholan Ula. Here is an excerpt of his inscription (Grantha and Tamil) from Chintamani, Karnataka mentioning the decimation of Kalinga while he was still a co-regent of his father. The same inscription also mentions the conquest of Kadal Malai, the seaport at the very edge of Mahabalipuram. Generally his inscription begin with-svasti sri Pū-mādu Punara Puvi-mādu valara Nā-mādu vilanga..:

He seems to have ascended the throne sometime prior to his 10th year for we have a similar Tamil inscription of his from Srinivaspur, Karnataka that gives him the title Parakesari. The title of his chief queen Mukkōkilānadigal (Queen of the Three Worlds) is also mentioned. We also have the Saka date 1049:

Recovery of Vengi

Vikrama Chola was crowned as the heir-apparent by his father early in his life. He was appointed as viceroy of the Vengi province in 1089 C.E., succeeding his brother Rajaraja Chodaganga. Vikrama during his tenure successfully managed to check the ambitions of the Western Chalukya Vikramaditya VI on the Vengi kingdom.

In 1118 C.E., the aging Kulothunga recalled Vikrama Chola from Vengi to the south to appoint him as his co-regent. He assumed many of the titles of his father including Rajakesari when he was a co-regent. He subsequently switched to Parakesari when he ascended the throne. This took place on 29 June 1118 C.E. Vikrama continued to rule joinltly with his father until the latter's death in 1122 C.E.  However the Western Chalukyas, utilising the opportunity of proper leadership in Vengi, invaded and captured the Eastern Chalukyan provinces.

Recovery of Kerala 
Corrections by M. G. S. Narayanan on K. A. Nilakanta Sastri are employed.

Vikrama Chola also oversaw the Chola recovery of the Chera Perumal kingdom (in present-day Kerala). It seems that Jatavarman Parakrama, the Chola-Pandya, carried out the Kerala campaigns for his Chola overlord. The Chola-Pandya captured the Ay country and Venadu (the Kupaka), defeated and levied tribute from the Chera Perumal and visited the famous Anantapuram Temple. The Chera Perumal Rama Kulashekhara is remembered in a record dated in the regnal years of Vikrama Chola from the Thiruvalanjuli temple (1122 AD).

Personal life 

Vikrama Chola was a great devotee of Siva and greatly patronised the temple at Chidambaram. In 1128 C.E. he signalled his devotion by allocating the entire revenue of the year to the upgrade and extension of the temple. He had the main Vimana of the temple and the roofs of the passages around the main deity covered with gold. He had a palace built near the temple and spent much of his time there. We have many important people making donations to various temples during his reign. The most characteristic title of Vikrama Chola was Tyagasamudra – the ocean of sacrifice, which is found in his inscriptions and in Vikramacholan Ula. We know the titles of three of his queens: Mukkōkilānadigal, Tyagapataka and Neriyan Madeviyar. Of his sons we only know of Kulothunga Chola II who succeeded him on the throne.

Religious contribution 
Vikrama Chola built a Siva temple at Ulagalanda Chola Mangalam (now renamed as Kalavai in Vellore district), this temple sivan is suyambu, A nataraja statue made by a pancha-loha, this is similar to Chithambaram Nataraja statue, kovil constructed using green stones (patchai kal).

Officials 
General Naralokaviran alias Ponnambalakuttan continued to serve Vikrama Chola after Kulottunga I. One of the vassals in the Andhra country was Madhurantaka Pottapi Chola, the son of Siddharasa. The officer claimed descent from the legendary Karikala Chola in epigraphs (Carana saroruha etc.).

Epigraphs 
A Tamil inscription of the king from Sidlaghatta district, dated in the second year of his reign and beginning with Pumagal Punara, states that Udayamartanda Brahmamarayan, an officer of the king with his residence in Arulmolideva Chaturvedimangalam, and who was well versed in Tamil, built the temple of Somesvarar in the village of Sugattur in Kaivara nadu. Vikrama Chola is called Pulivendan Koliyar kula Pati alias Rajayyar Vikrama Choladeva.

Notes

References
 Nilakanta Sastri, K. A. (1935). The Cōḷas, University of Madras, Madras (Reprinted 1984).
 Nilakanta Sastri, K. A. (1955). A History of South India, OUP, New Delhi (Reprinted 2002).
The History and Culture of the Indian People: The Struggle for Empire By Ramesh Chandra Majumdar, Bhāratīya Itihāsa Samiti
Epigraphia Carnatica, Volume 10, Part 1 by Benjamin Lewis Rice, Mysore (India: State). Archaeological Dept, Mysore Archaeological Survey
Epigraphy By Archaeological Survey of India. Southern Circle
History of Indian Administration: Volume 2 by Baij Nath Puri

12th-century Indian monarchs
Chola dynasty
1135 deaths